Magne Haraldstad (25 July 1937 – 11 April 2008) was a Norwegian politician for the Centre Party.

He served as a deputy representative to the Parliament of Norway from Vest-Agder during the term 1973–1977. In total he met during 12 days of parliamentary session.

References

1937 births
2008 deaths
Deputy members of the Storting
Centre Party (Norway) politicians
Vest-Agder politicians